Alexander George Lynn (born 17 September 1993) is a British racing driver. He most recently competed in Formula E, driving for Mahindra Racing in the 2021 season, winning the second race of his home ePrix in London. Lynn has also competed full-time in the 2019–20 FIA World Endurance Championship driving for Aston Martin Racing, has won the 2017 12 Hours of Sebring, and finished sixth in the 2015 and 2016 GP2 Series.

Early career 
He is a former pupil of Saint Nicholas School, Old Harlow, Essex.

Karting 
Lynn began his racing career in karting at the age of eleven with Andy Cox Racing. In 2008 after four years in Mini Max and JICA classes he switched to Ricky Flynn Motorsport for competing in KF2 category, finishing British KF2 championship on the sixth place in the series standings.

Formula Renault 
In 2009 Lynn made his début in single-seaters taking part in the Formula Renault UK Winter Cup for Fortec Motorsport, finishing tenth in the standings. He finished the main Formula Renault UK Series in the same position, winning the Graduate Cup by scoring his first podium at the final race of the season at Brands Hatch.

Lynn continued his collaboration with Fortec for 2010 Formula Renault UK Winter Cup and the 2011 main series, becoming champion in both series, with three and twelve wins respectively. He also appeared in the Eurocup Formula Renault 2.0 at Hungaroring and Silverstone. His best result was second place from pole at Silverstone.

Toyota Racing Series 
In the interval between 2010 Winter Cup and 2011 Formula Renault UK series he contested in Toyota Racing Series with Giles Motorsport, finishing ninth with a win in the first round of the series at Teretonga Park.

Lynn returned to New Zealand in January 2013 to contest the series again; this time with M2 Competition. 4 pole positions, 3 race wins, 9 podiums and 3 fastest laps gave him 2nd place overall and the highest placed international driver.

Formula Three 
On 20 October 2011 it was announced that Lynn would represent Fortec Motorsports in 2012 for the fourth consecutive year in British Formula 3 Championship. In addition he participated in selected Formula 3 Euro Series rounds.
Lynn finished the 2012 British Formula 3 season in 4th place, with a race win at Silverstone and 5 podium places as well as 2 podiums in the Formula 3 Euro Series.

In November 2012 Lynn travelled to Macau to compete in the prestigious 59th SJM Macau Grand Prix. Lynn earned pole position for the qualification race, the first rookie to do so since 2006. In the race itself Lynn finished on the podium in third position and the highest placed rookie driver overall.

On 15 November 2012 it was announced that Lynn would be moving to Prema Powerteam and racing in the FIA European F3 Championship for the 2013 season. Lynn achieved 3rd overall in the championship and highest placed rookie driver, with 3 race wins, 14 podiums and 5 pole positions; including triple pole position at his home round at Brands Hatch.

In November 2013 Lynn returned to Macau to compete once again in the Star River Windsor Arch 60th Macau Grand Prix with Theodore Racing by Prema, a collaboration between SJM Holdings, Teddy Yip Jr's Theodore Racing and Prema Powerteam. Theodore Racing had last appeared at the Grand Prix in 1992 and was celebrating 30 years since they had won the event with Ayrton Senna at the wheel. Lynn won the qualification race to give him pole position for the main race and went on to dominate the main race from start to finish; becoming the first Briton to win the Grand Prix since 2007.

GP3 Series 

Lynn competed in the GP3 Series in 2014 for Carlin Motorsport as a member of the Red Bull Junior Team programme. He won on his debut at the Circuit de Catalunya supporting the 2014 Spanish Grand Prix, starting from pole and setting the fastest race lap to take the maximum points from the race. In the sprint race he finished 18th, but still led the championship after its first round. Lynn won again at the Red Bull Ring in Austria, setting pole position before securing a comfortable win over his teammate, Emil Bernstorff. But again he was out of luck in the reverse grid race two, finishing 20th after picking up a lap-one puncture. The Briton was disappointed to miss out on a home win in the third round at Silverstone in the UK, but second in race one and a fighting sixth in race two helped him to maintain his championship lead. In round four at Hockenheim in Germany, Lynn consolidated that lead by finishing second and third in the two races. He then recorded two fourth-placed finishes at the Hungaroring to extend his title advantage to 31 points over Richie Stanaway heading into the summer break. In Belgium, he managed to score 4 championship points to take 8th place and the reverse grid pole for the following sprint race. He dominated the race, leading from start to finish. A similar situation happened in the next round at Monza, Italy where Lynn finished in 6th place for the feature race and managed to get 2nd in the sprint race due to his excellent driving as well as help with the reverse grid order rule in all GP categories.

GP2 Series

2015 
Having won the GP3 Series title in 2014, Lynn was rewarded with a day of testing with GP2 team ART Grand Prix. He followed this up with a day of testing with Carlin. In early January, Lynn, along with fellow Red Bull Junior Pierre Gasly, signed with DAMS in order to win the GP2 Series crown in 2015. He finished sixth in the championship, having scored two wins at Barcelona and the Hungaroring.

2016 
Lynn remained with DAMS for the 2016 season, scoring two victories in the sprint races at Barcelona and Hockenheim. After finishing the year sixth in the standings again, he left at the end of the season.

Formula One 
Following his win of the GP3 title, it was announced Lynn would partake in the post-season testing, driving for Lotus F1. On 28 January 2015, Lynn was confirmed as the new development driver for the Williams F1 team, thereby severing his ties with Red Bull.

Formula E career

2016-17 season 
In August 2016, Lynn was confirmed as one of four drivers partaking in Jaguar's pre-season test at Donington Park. Lynn landed the role of reserve driver for DS Virgin Racing in January 2017, and made his racing debut in July at the New York ePrix, in place of José María López due to the latter's WEC commitments. He qualified on pole in his first race, but retired from both the New York races.

2017-18 season 

On 5 September 2017, it was confirmed that Lynn signed a multi-year deal to race full-time in Formula E for DS Virgin Racing starting in the 2017-18 Formula E season. Despite good qualifying performances in three of the season's first four races, he lost grid position in all of the aforementioned events, but still managed three successive points-scoring finishes. He finished the season with five point scoring results, 17 points, and 16th in the standings.

2018-19 season 
Following his departure from Virgin, it was announced on 28 March 2019 that Lynn would replace Nelson Piquet Jr. at Jaguar from the seventh round of the 2018-19 season onwards. He scored points twice from the seven races, finishing with 10 points, and 18th in the standings.

2019-20 season 
Lynn left Jaguar, and became the test and reserve driver for Mahindra Racing for the 2018-19 season. Following Pascal Wehrlein leaving the team mid-season, Lynn once again drove the second half of the season, just like one year prior with Jaguar. He would perform better, finishing in the points three times, earning 16 points total, enough for 17th in the final standings.

2020-21 season 

Lynn was announced to partner Alexander Sims as the official driver line up of the Mahindra Racing Formula E team for the 2020–21 Formula E season. Lynn was taken to hospital after a crash in race 2 of the 2021 Diriyah ePrix, in which he launched over the rear wing of Mitch Evans' Jaguar, but wasn't seriously injured, and could race in all of the following races of the calendar. Lynn recorded his first podium in the 2021 Valencia ePrix, and then recorded another podium in the first race of the 2021 London ePrix, and won his first Formula E race at race 2 of his home ePrix in London. He finished the season with 3 podiums, 78 points, and 12th in the standings, just 21 points off the champion Nyck de Vries. Lynn was replaced by Oliver Rowland for the 2021-22 Formula E season, and left Formula E after being unable to secure a seat.

Hypercar career

2023: Move to Cadillac 
Lynn progressed to the Le Mans Hypercar category for the 2023 WEC season, driving a Cadillac V-Series.R alongside Earl Bamber and Richard Westbrook.

Racing record

Karting career summary

Racing career summary 

† As Lynn was a guest driver, he was ineligible to score points.
* Season still in progress.

Complete FIA Formula 3 European Championship results 
(key) (Races in bold indicate pole position) (Races in italics indicate fastest lap)

† – As Lynn was a guest driver, he was ineligible to score points.

Complete GP3 Series results 
(key) (Races in bold indicate pole position) (Races in italics indicate fastest lap)

Complete GP2 Series results 
(key) (Races in bold indicate pole position) (Races in italics indicate fastest lap)

Complete FIA World Endurance Championship results 
(key) (Races in bold indicate pole position; races in italics indicate fastest lap)

* Season still in progress.

Complete IMSA SportsCar Championship results 

* Season still in progress.

Complete 24 Hours of Le Mans results

Complete Formula E results 
(key) (Races in bold indicate pole position; races in italics indicate fastest lap)

References

External links 
 
 

1993 births
Living people
Sportspeople from Chelmsford
People from Great Dunmow
English racing drivers
British Formula Renault 2.0 drivers
Formula Renault Eurocup drivers
Toyota Racing Series drivers
FIA Institute Young Driver Excellence Academy drivers
British Formula Three Championship drivers
Formula 3 Euro Series drivers
FIA Formula 3 European Championship drivers
GP3 Series drivers
GP3 Series Champions
GP2 Series drivers
WeatherTech SportsCar Championship drivers
24 Hours of Le Mans drivers
Formula E drivers
12 Hours of Sebring drivers
FIA World Endurance Championship drivers
Fortec Motorsport drivers
Prema Powerteam drivers
Carlin racing drivers
DAMS drivers
Manor Motorsport drivers
Envision Virgin Racing drivers
G-Drive Racing drivers
Aston Martin Racing drivers
Jaguar Racing drivers
Mahindra Racing drivers
United Autosports drivers
R-Motorsport drivers
Blancpain Endurance Series drivers
M2 Competition drivers
Wayne Taylor Racing drivers
TDS Racing drivers
Schnitzer Motorsport drivers
Chip Ganassi Racing drivers
Nürburgring 24 Hours drivers